The Diocese of False Bay is a diocese in the Anglican Church of Southern Africa.

List of bishops
 Merwyn Edwin Castle (2 November 1942 - 2 August 2021) - 2006
 Margaret Vertue consecrated 19 January 2013

Sources
Desmond Tutu: Rabble-Rouser for Peace, by John Allen

External links
 

2005 establishments in South Africa
Anglican Church of Southern Africa dioceses